Syzygium goodenovii is a species of plant in the family. It is a tree found in Sumatra and Peninsular Malaysia.

References

goodenovii
Trees of Sumatra
Trees of Peninsular Malaysia
Least concern plants
Taxonomy articles created by Polbot
Taxobox binomials not recognized by IUCN